The Weightlifting at the 2006 Commonwealth Games was held in a custom-built temporary venue within the Melbourne Convention & Exhibition Centre from March 16 to 24 .

Medal table

Events

Men's events

Women's events

Powerlifting

References

External links
Schedule and Results

 
2006 Commonwealth Games events
2006
2006
2006 in weightlifting